Alfons Vogtel (9 June 1952 – 3 December 2022) was a German businessman and politician. A member of the Christian Democratic Union, he served in the Landtag of Saarland from 1985 to 2007.

Vogtel died in Völklingen on 3 December 2022, at the age of 70.

References

1952 births
2022 deaths
Christian Democratic Union of Germany politicians
Members of the Landtag of Saarland
People from Neunkirchen (German district)